Elk Range may refer to:

 Elk Range (California) 
 Elk Range (Canada)